Agylla corcovada is a moth of the family Erebidae. It was described by William Schaus in 1894. It is found in Rio de Janeiro and Bolivia.

References

Moths described in 1894
corcovada
Moths of South America